Enterprise data management (EDM) is the ability of an organization to precisely define, easily integrate and effectively retrieve data for both internal applications and external communication. EDM focuses on the creation of accurate, consistent, and transparent content.  EDM emphasizes data precision, granularity, and meaning and is concerned with how the content is integrated into business applications as well as how it is passed along from one business process to another.

EDM arose to address circumstances where users within organizations independently source, model, manage and store data.  Uncoordinated approaches by various segments of the organization can result in data conflicts and quality inconsistencies, lowering the trustworthiness of the data as it is used for operations and reporting. 

The goal of EDM is trust and confidence in data assets.  Its components are:

Strategy and governance
EDM requires a strategic approach to choosing the right processes, technologies, and resources (i.e. data owners, governance, stewardship, data analysts, and data architects).  EDM is a challenge for organizations because it requires alignment among multiple stakeholders (including IT, operations, finance, strategy, and end-users) and relates to an area (creation and use of common data) that has not traditionally had a clear “owner.”  

The governance challenge can be a big obstacle to the implementation of an effective EDM because of the difficulties associated with providing a business case on the benefits of data management.  The core of the challenge is due to the fact that data quality has no intrinsic value.  It is an enabler of other processes and the true benefits of effective data management are systematic and intertwined with other processes.  This makes it hard to quantify all the downstream implications or upstream improvements.  

The difficulties associated with quantification of EDM benefits translate into challenges with the positioning of EDM as an organizational priority.  Achieving organizational alignment on the importance of data management (as well as managing data as an ongoing area of focus) is the domain of governance.  In recent years the establishment of an EDM and the EDM governance practice has become commonplace despite these difficulties.

Program implementation
Implementation of an EDM program encompasses many processes – all of which need to be coordinated throughout the organization and managed while maintaining operational continuity.  Below are some of the major components of EDM implementation that should be given consideration:

Stakeholder requirements
EDM requires alignment among multiple stakeholders (at the right level of authority) who all need to understand and support the EDM objectives.  EDM begins with a thorough understanding of the requirements of the end users and the organization as a whole.  Managing stakeholder requirements is a critical, and ongoing, process based in an understanding of workflow, data dependencies and the tolerance of the organization for operational disruption.  Many organizations use formal processes such as service level agreements to specify requirements and establish EDM program objectives.

Policies and procedures
Effective EDM usually includes the creation, documentation and enforcement of operating policies and procedures associated with change management, (i.e. data model, business glossary, master data shared domains, data cleansing and normalization), data stewardship, security constraints and dependency rules.  In many cases, these policies and procedures are documented for the first time as part of the EDM initiative.

Data definitions and tagging

One of the core challenges associated with EDM is the ability to compare data that is obtained from multiple internal and external sources.  In many circumstances, these sources use inconsistent terms and definitions to describe the data content itself – making it hard to compare data, hard to automate business processes, hard to feed complex applications and hard to exchange data.  This frequently results in a difficult process of data mapping and cross-referencing.  Normalization of all the terms and definitions at the data attribute level is referred to as the metadata component of EDM and is an essential prerequisite for effective data management.

Platform requirements
Even though EDM is fundamentally a data content challenge, there is a core technology dimension that must be addressed.  Organizations need to have a functional storage platform, a comprehensive data model and a robust messaging infrastructure.  They must be able to integrate data into applications and deal with the challenges of the existing (i.e. legacy) technology infrastructure.  Building the platform or partnering with an established technology provider on how the data gets stored and integrated into business applications is an essential component of the EDM process.

Enterprise data management as an essential business requirement has emerged as a priority for many organizations.  The objective is confidence and trust in data as the glue that holds business strategy together.

See also
 Master data management
 Master data
 Web data integration

References

General
 Enterprise Data Management Council http://www.edmcouncil.org
 Issues in Enterprise Data Management: A Survey Report, 12/06
 DataSecOps Solution

Data management
Product lifecycle management